Interstate 680 (I-680) is a north–south auxiliary Interstate Highway in Northern California. It curves around the eastern cities of the San Francisco Bay Area from San Jose to I-80 at Fairfield, bypassing cities along the eastern shore of San Francisco Bay such as Oakland and Richmond while serving others more inland such as Pleasanton and Concord.

Built in the 1920s and designated in 1955, I-680 begins at a junction with I-280 and US Route 101 (US 101/Bayshore Freeway) and heads northeast and north-northwest through the northeast part of San Jose. After passing State Route 237 (SR 237) in Milpitas and SR 262 in Fremont, I-680 abruptly turns northeast (where a connection to a SR 238 freeway was planned) and enters the hills and valleys of the California Coast Ranges. The highway crosses over Mission Pass, also known as the Sunol Grade, and descends into the Sunol Valley, where it meets SR 84 near Sunol. From Sunol, I-680 again heads north-northwesterly through valleys, including the San Ramon Valley, along the Calaveras Fault. Junctions along this portion include I-580 in Dublin and SR 24 in Walnut Creek. Beyond the latter interchange, a three-way directional junction with the SR 24 freeway west to Oakland, I-680 heads north into Pleasant Hill, where SR 242 splits and I-680 again heads northwesterly. After the junction with SR 4 in Martinez, the highway crosses the Carquinez Strait on the Benicia–Martinez Bridge, immediately meeting the east end of I-780 on the Benicia end. The remainder of I-680, from Benicia to I-80 at Fairfield, lies between a hilly area to the west representing the southwestern tip of the Vaca Mountains, and a marshy area (along the Suisun Bay and Cordelia Slough) to the east.

Route description

The route begins at US 101 at the Joe Colla Interchange, where it acts as a continuation of I-280 eastward. The next exit northbound is SR 130, which is also known as Alum Rock Avenue, unsigned at the intersection. As it continues through Santa Clara County, it meets numerous local roads before interchanging with the Montague Expressway (CR G4). Here, it exits San Jose and enters the city of Milpitas, where it meets SR 237, often referred to as Calaveras Boulevard. After one more intersection, I-680 exits Santa Clara County and enters Alameda County.

In Alameda County, the freeway begins in the city of Fremont, where it intersects SR 262, which was unsigned until 2000. Continuing through the city, it meets Mission Boulevard at SR 238 before exiting the city. Prior to 2002, two ghost ramps existed here, remains of an abandoned freeway project replacing Mission Boulevard. Amid Alameda County, it abruptly turns northeastward and enters a hilly area, where it crosses over Mission Pass, and descends into the Sunol Valley, where it runs concurrently with SR 84 for a short while. Afterward, it enters Pleasanton and intersects with I-580, currently California's longest auxiliary Interstate providing access to Oakland and the Central Valley. It enters Dublin for a short segment before exiting the county and entering Contra Costa County.

Upon entering Contra Costa County, the route meets numerous local roads through the cities of San Ramon, Danville, and Alamo before entering Walnut Creek, where it meets SR 24. I-680 then enters Pleasant Hill for a short time and Concord, where it meets SR 242. Upon exiting Concord, it meets SR 4. It then enters Martinez, where it follows the Benicia–Martinez Bridge over the Carquinez Strait, on which the route crosses the county line and enters Benicia in Solano County. On the Benicia–Martinez Bridge, I-680 northbound is tolled, while I-680 southbound is free. In Benicia, I-680 interchanges with I-780. It then exits the city and, after passing through rural areas, routing parallel to the San Joaquin Delta, it enters Fairfield, where it meets I-80, which is the route's northern terminus.

In the wake of the September 11 attacks, a US flag was painted on a large piece of concrete on a hill along the Sunol Grade. It stayed there for nine years before the California Department of Transportation (Caltrans) painted it over, as the mural had been painted on without authorization. Due to this action being taken shortly before July 4, 2010, and also due to the mural's fame, this was met with controversy. The flag was replaced shortly later.

Of the above names, only the name Sinclair Freeway for its designated portion usually appears on maps, and the other portions on maps are always unnamed, referred to as simply I-680.

I-680 is part of the California Freeway and Expressway System and is part of the National Highway System, a network of highways that are considered essential to the country's economy, defense, and mobility by the Federal Highway Administration (FHWA). I-680 is eligible to be included in the State Scenic Highway System from the Santa Clara–Alameda county line to SR 24 in Walnut Creek but is only a scenic route from Mission Boulevard to the Contra Costa county line and from the Alameda county line to SR 24; this means that those portions are substantial sections of highway passing through a "memorable landscape" with no "visual intrusions", where the potential designation has gained popular favor with the community.

Tolls

Express lanes
There are two sections of High-occupancy toll (HOT) lanes along I-680. The  southbound HOT lane along I-680 between SR 84 in Alameda County and through the Sunol Grade to SR 237 in Santa Clara County opened on September 20, 2010. The northbound HOT lane along the same stretch opened in October 2020 but initially as high-occupancy vehicle (HOV) lanes; tolling was halted on this segment of I-680 due to the COVID-19 pandemic and will be resumed in fall 2022.

HOT lanes then opened in October 2017 in both directions on the portion from slightly south of Alcosta Boulevard near the Alameda–Contra Costa line to Rudgear Road in Walnut Creek. On August 20, 2021, the southbound HOT lanes were extended north from Rudgear Road to Marina Vista Boulevard in Martinez.

, the HOT lanes' hours of operation is weekdays between 5:00 am and 8:00 pm. Solo drivers are tolled using a congestion pricing system based on the real-time levels of traffic. Carpools, motorcycles, and clean air vehicles with two or more people are not charged. For clean-air vehicles with a solo driver, 50 percent of the posted toll is charged. All tolls are collected using an open road tolling system, and therefore there are no toll booths to receive cash. Each vehicle is required to carry either a FasTrak Flex or CAV (Clean Air Vehicle) transponder, with its switch set to indicate the number of the vehicle's occupants (one, two, three, or more). Solo drivers may also use the FasTrak standard tag without the switch. Drivers without any FasTrak tag will be assessed a toll violation regardless of whether they qualified for free.

Benicia–Martinez Bridge

Tolls are collected only for northbound traffic on the Benicia–Martinez Bridge. An open road tolling system is also used on the bridge, and they can be paid by either a FasTrak transponder or license plate tolling. The high-occupancy vehicle (HOV) lane leading to the bridge requires a car with three or more people.

History

Historic routing

By the 1920s, a road ran south from Martinez through Walnut Creek, Dublin, Danville, and Sunol to Mission San Jose, where it met Legislative Route 5 (Mission Boulevard, signed over the years as US 48, US 101E, SR 9, and now SR 238). It was not yet paved south of Dublin, where it crossed Mission Pass between the Sunol Valley and the San Francisco Bay basin. The majority of this roadway was added to the state highway system in 1933 as portions of several routes: Route 108 from Mission San Jose to Sunol, Route 107 from Sunol to Walnut Creek, and Route 75 from Walnut Creek to Pleasant Hill.

At Martinez, the Martinez–Benicia Ferry took automobiles across the Carquinez Strait to Benicia, where Route 7, one of the original state highways from the 1910 bond issue, led north and northeast past Fairfield toward Sacramento and Oregon. The portion north from Benicia to Fairfield became part of Route 74 in 1935, when Route 7 was realigned to the more direct American Canyon route that is now I-80. None of the aforementioned roads were given state sign route numbers in 1934, when that system was laid out, but, by 1937, they had been numbered SR 21. This route began at the intersection of Warm Springs Boulevard and Brown Road in Warm Springs, where Route 5 and Route 69 (SR 17) split, followed Route 5 along Mission Boulevard to Mission San Jose (this part later became a concurrency with SR 9), and then continued to US 40 (Route 7) at Cordelia. The routing was very close to the present I-680, following such roads as Pleasanton Sunol Road, San Ramon Valley Boulevard, Danville Boulevard, Main Street in Walnut Creek, Contra Costa Boulevard, and Pacheco Boulevard.

The portion of SR 21 between Pleasant Hill and Martinez was finally added to the state highway system in 1949, as a branch of Route 75. The ferry approach in Benicia became a spur of Route 74 in 1947, and, in 1953, it was transferred to Route 75. The same law, effective immediately as an urgency measure, authorized the Department of Public Works to acquire the ferry system, then operated by the city of Martinez, which was planning to shut it down. Ownership was transferred just after midnight on October 6, 1953.

History as an Interstate

The Bureau of Public Roads approved urban routes of the Interstate Highway System on September 15, 1955, including a loop around the San Francisco Bay, soon numbered I-280 and I-680. The east half (I-680) began at the interchange of US 101 north of Downtown San Jose and followed the Nimitz Freeway (SR 17/Route 69, now I-880) to the split at Warm Springs (the present location of SR 262), SR 21 to Benicia, and Route 74 (no sign route number) to I-80 in Vallejo. The first piece of I-680 freeway built, other than the preexisting Nimitz Freeway, was in the late 1950s, along the SR 24 overlap between North Main Street in Walnut Creek and Monument Boulevard in Pleasant Hill. A southerly extension, bypassing downtown Walnut Creek to South Main Street, opened on March 22, 1960, connecting with the SR 24 freeway to Oakland. In the next decade, the freeway was completed from Vallejo south to SR 238 at Mission San Jose, and the roadway north from Benicia to Fairfield, which became the only remaining piece of SR 21, was also upgraded to freeway standards.

In the 1964 state highway renumbering, the legislative designation was changed to Route 680. SR 17 was officially moved to former Route 5 between San Jose and Warm Springs, which had not had a signed designation since the Nimitz Freeway (then I-680) was constructed, but this was instead marked as part of SR 238 (which replaced SR 9 north of Mission San Jose), and SR 17 remained signed along the Nimitz Freeway. This was very short-lived, as the Bureau of Public Roads approved a shift in the south end of I-680 in October 1964. The legislature changed the routes in 1965, swapping Route 17 and Route 680 south of Warm Springs and creating a new SR 262 on the short roadway at Warm Springs where they had overlapped to switch sides. However, until I-680 was completed in the early-to-mid 1970s, it remained signed along the Nimitz Freeway, and the old road between San Jose and Warm Springs continued to be marked as SR 238. One more change was made to the routing of I-680: in July 1973, the remainder of SR 21, from Benicia to Fairfield, was added to the Interstate Highway System. This became the new alignment of I-680, and the old route to Vallejo became I-780. The corresponding changes were made by the state legislature in 1976.

Exit list

See also

References

External links

Bay Area FasTrak – includes toll information on the I-680 Express Lanes, the Benicia–Martinez Bridge, and the other Bay Area toll facilities
California Highways: Interstate 680
California @ AARoads.com - I-680
Caltrans: Route 680 highway conditions

80-6
680
80-6 California
6 California
Interstate 80-6
Interstate 80-6
Interstate 80-6
Interstate 80-6
680